Koktobe refers to several inhabited localities in Kazakhstan.

Rural localities
Koktobe, Almaty Province, a selo in Eskeldi District of Almaty Province
Koktobe, Pavlodar Province, a selo and the administrative center of May District in Pavlodar Province

Populated places in Kazakhstan